Reinsberg may refer to:
 Reinsberg, Germany, a municipality in the district of Mittelsachsen, in Saxony, Germany
 Reinsberg, Austria, a municipality in the district of Scheibbs in Lower Austria, Austria

et:Reinsbergi vald
eo:Reinsberg
no:Reinsberg
ro:Reinsberg
ru:Райнсберг
sr:Рајнсберг
vi:Reinsberg
war:Reinsberg